Robert Bowden Francis (born April 22, 1996) is an American professional baseball pitcher in the Toronto Blue Jays organization. He made his MLB debut in 2022.

High school and college
Francis was born on April 22, 1996, in Tallahassee, Florida. He attended Chipola College in Marianna, Florida, and was drafted by the Milwaukee Brewers in the seventh round of the 2017 Major League Baseball draft.

Professional career

Milwaukee Brewers
Francis made his professional debut with the Arizona League Brewers, pitching to a 8.10 earned run average (ERA) in four games. Francis split the 2018 season between the Class-A Wisconsin Timber Rattlers and the Advanced-A Carolina Mudcats, posting a 7–10 win–loss record, 4.50 ERA, and 106 strikeouts in 128 innings pitched. The following season, Francis split the year between Carolina and the Double-A Biloxi Shuckers, and posted an 8–9 record, 3.97 ERA, and 165 strikeouts in 142 innings of work. Francis did not play in a game in 2020 due to the COVID-19 pandemic's cancellation of the minor league season. Francis began the 2021 season with Biloxi before being promoted to the Triple-A Nashville Sounds at the end of May. In 11 games between the two levels, Francis logged a 7–3 record and 3.62 ERA with 65 strikeouts in 59 innings pitched.

Toronto Blue Jays
On July 6, 2021, Francis was traded to the Toronto Blue Jays along with Trevor Richards in exchange for Rowdy Tellez. He was assigned to the Triple-A Buffalo Bisons and remained with the team for the rest of the minor league season. In 73 innings for the Bisons, Francis went 6–4 with a 4.19 ERA and 71 strikeouts. He was added to the 40-man roster following the season on November 19, 2021.

On April 25, 2022, Francis was called up by the Blue Jays. He was sent outright to Triple-A on June 18, 2022.

Personal life
Francis's younger brother, Harrison, was selected by the Arizona Diamondbacks in the fourth round of the 2017 Major League Baseball draft.

References

External links

Living people
1996 births
Baseball players from Tallahassee, Florida
Major League Baseball pitchers
Toronto Blue Jays players
Chipola Indians baseball players
Arizona League Brewers players
Wisconsin Timber Rattlers players
Carolina Mudcats players
Biloxi Shuckers players
Nashville Sounds players
Buffalo Bisons (minor league) players